The 3 arrondissements of the Drôme department are:
 Arrondissement of Die, (subprefecture: Die) with 113 communes.  The population of the arrondissement was 67,063 in 2016.  
 Arrondissement of Nyons, (subprefecture: Nyons) with 149 communes.  The population of the arrondissement was 148,049 in 2016.  
 Arrondissement of Valence, (prefecture of the Drôme department: Valence) with 102 communes. The population of the arrondissement was 292,921 in 2016.

History

In 1800 the arrondissements of Valence, Die, Montélimar and Nyons were established. The arrondissement of Montélimar was disbanded in 1926. In 2006 the four cantons of Dieulefit, Marsanne, Montélimar-1 and Montélimar-2 that previously belonged to the arrondissement of Valence were assigned to the arrondissement of Nyons. 

The borders of the arrondissements of Drôme were modified in January 2017:
 six communes from the arrondissement of Die to the arrondissement of Nyons
 one commune from the arrondissement of Die to the arrondissement of Valence
 17 communes from the arrondissement of Valence to the arrondissement of Die
 one commune from the arrondissement of Valence to the arrondissement of Nyons

References

Drome